Variimorda ragusai is a species of tumbling flower beetles in the subfamily Mordellinae of the family Mordellidae.

Subspecies
Variimorda ragusai nigrata (Méquignon, 1946)
Variimorda ragusai ragusai (Emery, 1876)

References

External links
 Biolib
 Fauna Europaea

Mordellidae
Beetles of Europe
Beetles described in 1876